Achille Tribouillet (25 December 1902 – 1968) was a French water polo player who competed in the 1928 Summer Olympics. He was born in Tourcoing.

See also
 List of Olympic medalists in water polo (men)

References

External links
 

1902 births
1968 deaths
Sportspeople from Tourcoing
French male water polo players
Olympic water polo players of France
Water polo players at the 1928 Summer Olympics
Olympic bronze medalists for France
Olympic medalists in water polo
Medalists at the 1928 Summer Olympics
20th-century French people